Church of St Peter is a  Grade I listed church in Wrestlingworth, Bedfordshire, England. It became a listed building on 31 October 1966.

See also
 Grade I listed buildings in Bedfordshire

History and Architecture
Built in the 12th century, it was restored in Victorian times. The church, which is dedicated to St. Peter, consists of a tower, nave, two aisles, chancel, and a south porch. The font is located on the north side of the nave, and is adorned with quatrefoils. A reading desk and pulpit are located in the northeast section. The communion table and some tombstones are 17th-century, while the pulpit and stairs are 18th-century, and some glass is of medieval era.

References

Church of England church buildings in Bedfordshire
Grade I listed churches in Bedfordshire
12th-century church buildings in England